William Henry Schutte (May 7, 1910 – May 24, 1994) was an American football player and coach.   He served as the head football coach at San Diego State University from 1947 to 1955, compiling a record of 48–36–4.  Prior to being hired at San Diego State, Schutte was an assistant coach at Kansas State University.

Head coaching record

College

References

1910 births
1994 deaths
Idaho Vandals football players
Kansas State Wildcats football coaches
San Diego State Aztecs football coaches
Sportspeople from Galveston, Texas